Neohemsleya is a genus of plant in family Sapotaceae described as a genus in 1991.

There is only one known species, Neohemsleya usambarensis, endemic to the Usambara Mountains of Tanzania.

The species is listed as vulnerable.

References

Sapotoideae
Monotypic Ericales genera
Flora of Tanzania
Vulnerable plants
Taxonomy articles created by Polbot
Sapotaceae genera